"Remember the Name" is a song by Fort Minor, the hip hop side project of rock band Linkin Park's co-lead vocalist Mike Shinoda. It is the second single from his 2005 album The Rising Tied and features underground hip hop band Styles of Beyond. It was released alongside the album's first single, "Petrified". A music video for the song was directed by Kimo Proudfoot.

The single initially failed to chart in 2005. However, in 2006, the single received moderate success due to its use in the media and possibly the success of "Where'd You Go", another Fort Minor single. Despite numerous low peaks in different charts, the song was used extensively in the media, particularly at sports events, and eventually received a Platinum certification by the Recording Industry Association of America in 2009 and a Gold certification by the British Phonographic Industry in 2021. In 2018 the RIAA certified the song 4× Platinum.

Background
David Campbell conducted the strings for the song. Since Shinoda performed the main loop on the keyboards, the cellists had a difficult time performing the loop. Eventually, they resorted to breaking up the phrase, such that each cellist plays one or two notes.

Music video
The music video, directed by Kimo Proudfoot, shows the song's three vocalists, Mike Shinoda and hip-hop group Styles of Beyond  members Takbir Bashir and Ryan Maginn, walking around a bar. The video has cameo appearances from Chester Bennington, Brad Delson, and Rob Bourdon of Linkin Park, singer Holly Brook, Rob Dyrdek and Christopher "Big Black" Boykin of MTV's Rob & Big, DJ Cheapshot and Vin Skully of Styles of Beyond, and rapper Sixx John.

Track listing

Appearance in media
The song has been used extensively in the media, and played at many stadiums and arenas throughout the United States, including several colleges. The National Basketball Association used "Remember the Name" as the theme song for the 2006 and 2007 NBA Playoffs as well as the 2008 NBA Draft. The song is also featured on the soundtrack of the EA Sports video game NBA Live 06.

The song was used in "The OG", the twelfth episode in the second season of the CBS TV series Numb3rs.

The song is featured in promotional TV trailers for the 2006 movie, Gridiron Gang, NBC's 2006 series, Friday Night Lights, and Pride, directed by Sunu Gonera, as well as the trailer for Fighting, the trailer for The Adventures of Sharkboy and Lavagirl in 3-D, and the trailer for the 2010 remake of The Karate Kid. The song was also featured in the 2018 movie Peter Rabbit, with some lyrics changed to fit the context of the movie.

The song has been featured in the TV commercial for the 50th Grammy Awards in 2008.

On March 19, 2011, UFC premiered the trailer for UFC 129, which featured the song.

The song was also featured in the 2013 film The Smurfs 2.

On April 3, 2016, WWE used the song in the opening video package for WrestleMania 32.

In 2019 the BBC used a cover of the song by Ms Banks to promote its coverage of the FIFA Women's World Cup.

In 2022, WWE again used the song for retrospective packages to promote the 20th anniversary of the debut of John Cena, as well as Cena's match on the December 30, 2022 episode of Smackdown

Charts

Certifications

References

External links

2005 songs
2005 singles
Fort Minor songs
Turner Sports
Songs written by Mike Shinoda
Warner Records singles